Edith Parker (October 18, 1876 - September 10, 1974) was an American tennis player from the start of the 20th century.

Career
In 1900, she reached the final of the women's singles of the US Women's National Championship, where she was beaten by Myrtle McAteer, but then beat her in the women's doubles final with Hallie Champlin.

At the tournament now known as the Cincinnati Masters, she reached the singles semifinals in 1901 (falling to Juliette Atkinson) and 1904 (falling to Winona Closterman). She also reached two singles quarterfinals in Cincinnati - in 1899 (losing to Myrtle McAteer) and 1900 (losing to Mardi Hunt).

In 1899 she won the singles title at the Niagara International Tennis Tournament, and reached the final the following year. In 1909 at the Western Tennis Championships she reached the singles final before falling to Carrie Neely.

Grand Slam finals

Singles (1 runner-up)

Doubles (1 title)

Personal life
On February 15, 1909, in Chicago, Illinois, Parker married Charles Neville Beard (1872-1943). Thereafter she was referred to as "Mrs. C.N. Beard" in newspapers and tennis periodicals.

Notes

References

19th-century American people
19th-century female tennis players
American female tennis players
United States National champions (tennis)
Grand Slam (tennis) champions in women's doubles
1876 births
1974 deaths